Nashville Women is a studio album by American country singer–songwriter Hank Locklin. It was released in August 1967 via RCA Victor Records and was produced by Chet Atkins. Nashville Women was Locklin's sixteenth studio recording and contained 12 tracks. Three of the album's tracks were singles that became minor hits on the country chart in 1967. The album itself would also chart following its release. Nashville Women would receive positive reviews from critics and music publications.

Background and content
Although Hank Locklin had his biggest hits several years prior ("Send Me the Pillow You Dream On" and "Please Help Me, I'm Falling"), he continued having charting country singles through the remainder of the 1960s. Songs such as "Insurance" and "The Girls Get Prettier" helped facilitate the release of further Locklin studio albums, including Nashville Women. The studio project was recorded in sessions between 1964 and 1967 at the RCA Victor Studio, located in Nashville, Tennessee. The sessions were produced by Chet Atkins, Locklin's longtime producer at RCA.

Nashville Women contained a total of 12 tracks. Locklin composed the track, "This Memory," which was included towards the end of the record. Other writers who contributed to the record included Liz Anderson, Harlan Howard and Marijohn Wilkin. Howard had composed the album's title track. The album also featured a cover of "Release Me (And Let Me Love You Again)," which had originally been covered by various country and pop artists. Also included is a cover of Carl and Pearl Butler's number one country hit, "Don't Let Me Cross Over."

Release and reception

Nashville Women was released in August 1967 on RCA Victor Records. It would be Locklin's sixteenth studio recording released in his career. It was also his second studio album released in 1967. The album was distributed originally as a vinyl LP, containing six songs on each side of the record. Nashville Women became Locklin's second album to chart on the Billboard Top Country Albums list. It spent a total of two weeks on the chart and peaked at number 36 in October 1967. The record received a positive response from music publications and critics following its release. Billboard magazine positively commented that the album would be sure to please fans of Hank Locklin and that record stores would see high sales. Thom Owens of Allmusic would also review the album in later years, giving it four out of five stars. "Although it has a couple of slow spots, Nashville Women is a highly enjoyable LP, boasting a number of engaging country-pop songs," he wrote.

Nashville Women included three songs that were released as singles. The first single release was "The Best Part of Loving You," which was originally released in September 1966. The song would peak at number 69 on the Billboard Hot Country Singles chart in October 1966. "Hasta Luego (See You Later)" was released as the second single in January 1967. Spending ten weeks on the Billboard country songs chart, it would peak at number 41. The final single released off the album was its title track. It was issued in May 1967. Spending only four weeks on the Billboard country singles chart, it would peak at number 73 in July 1967.

Track listings

Vinyl version

Digital version

Personnel
All credits are adapted from the liner notes of Nashville Women.

Musical and technical personnel
 Chet Atkins – producer
 The Jordanaires – background vocals
 Hank Locklin – lead vocals
 Jim Malloy – recording engineer
 Chuck Seitz – recording engineer
 Bill Vandevort – recording engineer

Chart performance

Release history

References

1967 albums
Albums produced by Chet Atkins
Hank Locklin albums
RCA Victor albums